Love My Life may refer to:

 Love My Life (manga), a 2001 Japanese josei manga by Ebine Yamaji
 "Love My Life" (song), a 2016 song by Robbie Williams